{{Infobox radio station
| name             = KDEM
| logo             = KDEM-logo.png
| logo_size        = 200px
| city             = Deming, New Mexico
| area             =
| branding         = The Mix
| frequency        = 94.3 MHz
| repeater         = 
| airdate          = July 1983
| format           = Adult contemporary
| erp              = 3,000 watts
| haat             = 59 meters
| class            = A
| facility_id      = 39245
| coordinates      = 
| callsign_meaning = ''DEMing
| former_callsigns = 
| affiliations     = AP Radio
| owner            = Luna County Broadcasting Co.
| licensee         = 
| sister_stations  = KOTS
| webcast          = 
| website          = demingradio.com 
}}KDEM''' (94.3 FM) is a radio station broadcasting an adult contemporary music format. Licensed to Deming, New Mexico, United States. The station is currently owned by Luna County Broadcasting Co. and includes programming from AP Radio.

References

External links

DEM
Mainstream adult contemporary radio stations in the United States
Radio stations established in 1983